BBC Cardiff Singer of the World competition (known as Cardiff Singer of the World from 1983–2001 and BBC Singer of the World in Cardiff in 2003) is a competition for classical singers held every two years.

The competition was started by BBC Wales in 1983 to celebrate the opening of St David's Hall in Cardiff, Wales, home of the BBC National Orchestra of Wales. The creation of the competition was overseen by Geraint Stanley Jones, who was the controller at BBC Wales at the time.
 
Auditions are held throughout the world in the autumn before the competition, with singers being selected to take part in Cardiff the following June. Each singer represents their own country. In Wales there is a competition to select the national representative; the winner of the Welsh Singers Showcase represents Wales in BBC Cardiff Singer of the World competition.

The competition is judged by a panel of distinguished singers, musicians and music professionals. In 2003 an audience prize was also introduced for the primary competition; in 2011 it was renamed the Dame Joan Sutherland Audience Prize to mark the passing of the singer who was the competition's first patron.

History
In 1983, the first year of the competition, eighteen singers participated. The winner was Finnish soprano Karita Mattila.

 
A Lieder Prize was introduced in 1989, as art song and opera are both important forms of singing, but very different. The 1989 competition was particularly noteworthy with Welsh baritone Bryn Terfel winning the Lieder prize and Russian baritone Dmitri Hvorostovsky taking the overall title. Both singers went on to enjoy extremely successful careers with international acclaim.

The "Song Prize" (formerly the "Lieder Prize") was renamed in 2001 in order to clarify that it applies to art song and folksong rather than German Lieder only. The "Song Prize" became a separate event in 2003, named as the BBC Cardiff Singer of the World Rosenblatt Recital Song Prize. However, after 2009, its name was changed to BBC Cardiff Singer of the World Song Prize. It is not compulsory, and the only entry requirement is that the singer is taking part in the primary competition. It is not possible to enter for the "Song Prize" only. In 2001, Romanian tenor Marius Brenciu became the first singer to win both prizes.

Finnish baritone Tommi Hakala won in 2003, with the Song Prize going to Irish soprano Ailish Tynan. The first "Audience Prize", voted for by the audience both in the hall and for the broadcasts, was awarded to Chilean soprano Angela Marambio.

The 2005 prize was won by American soprano Nicole Cabell, with English tenor Andrew Kennedy winning the "Song Prize" and the "Audience Prize" being won by Korean soprano Ha-Joung Lee.

Chinese singer Shen Yang (subsequently known as Shenyang) won the 2007 competition, The "Song Prize" was won by English soprano Elizabeth Watts, while Jacques Imbrailo, South African baritone, won the "Audience Prize".

In 2009, the winner was Russian soprano Ekaterina Scherbachenko. The winner of the "Song Prize" was bass Jan Martinik from the Czech Republic and Italian tenor Giordano Luca took the "Audience Prize".

Followed a revised format and schedule, the 2011 competition had 20 singers taking part in four preliminary concerts. The 2011 winner was Moldovan soprano Valentina Naforniță, who also won the newly renamed "Dame Joan Sutherland Audience Prize". The "Song Prize" was won by Ukrainian baritone Andrei Bondarenko.

The 30th anniversary competition took place between 16 and 23 June 2013. It was won by US mezzo-soprano Jamie Barton, who also won the "Song Prize". The "Dame Joan Sutherland Audience Prize" was won by English tenor Ben Johnson.

Many non-winning finalists have gone on to very distinguished operatic careers. Examples include Finnish soprano Soile Isokoski in 1987, Swedish dramatic soprano Nina Stemme in 1993 and Latvian mezzo-soprano Elina Garanca in 2001 .

Organisation
The competition is organised by BBC Cymru Wales and was televised nationwide by BBC Two until 2013 and on BBC Four since 2003 (BBC Knowledge in 2001). Additionally, the competition is televised by BBC Two Wales, in Welsh on S4C and broadcast over radio channels BBC Radio 3, BBC Radio Wales and the Welsh language BBC Radio Cymru. All coverage can also be found on BBC iPlayer. It is supported by Welsh National Opera and the City and County of Cardiff.

From 2003, the competition's first patron was Dame Joan Sutherland, until her death in 2010. Since 2011, the patron has been Dame Kiri Te Kanawa.

Presenters
The following have hosted stages of the competition:

BBC Two (1983–2011), BBC Knowledge (2001) and BBC Four (2003–present):

 Brian Kay (1983–1987)
 Frank Lincoln (1983)
 Chris Stuart (1989)
 Humphrey Burton (1991)
 Natalie Wheen (1993–1997)
 Iain Burnside (1993–1997)
 Michael White (1995)
 Huw Edwards (1997–2009)
 Petroc Trelawny (1999–present)
 Gwenan Edwards (1999–2003)
 Barbara Bonney (2001, 2003)
 Aled Jones (2003, 2005)
 Sian Williams (2007)
 Danielle de Niese (2013)
 Angel Blue (2015, 2017)
 Josie D'Arby (2019–present)

BBC Radio 3 live coverage:
 Catherine Bott (2007, 2009)
 Fiona Talkington (2009)
 Iain Burnside (2011–2015, 2019)
 Donald Macleod (2011, 2013)
 Susan Bullock (2015)
 Kate Molleson (2017–present)

BBC Two Wales highlights:
 Aled Jones (2007, 2009)
 Josie D'Arby (2009–present)
 Tim Rhys-Evans (2011–present)
 Connie Fisher (2011, 2013)

BBC Radio Wales:
 Nicola Heywood Thomas (2009–2015)
 Beverley Humphreys (2011, 2013, 2019)
 Wynne Evans (2015–present)
 Rebecca Evans (2017)

BBC Radio Cymru:
 Siân Pari Huws (2009–2015)
 Alwyn Humphreys (2009–2013, 2019)
 Beti George (2009–2013, 2019)
 Alun Guy (2013)
 Nia Roberts (2017)
 Heledd Cynwal (2019)

S4C highlights:
 Siân Pari Huws (2013)
 Heledd Cynwal (2015, 2017)

Jury 
Many prominent singers have served in the jury, including Carlo Bergonzi, Sir Geraint Evans, Marilyn Horne, Gundula Janowitz, Dame Kiri Te Kanawa, Sherrill Milnes, Christoph Prégardien, Dame Joan Sutherland, Dame Anne Evans, René Kollo, Galina Vishnevskaya and Dame Gwyneth Jones, Irina Arkhipova and Shen Xiang. There is a separate jury for the "Song Prize", with some members serving on both juries. The 2019 jury included Dame Felicity Lott and Robert Holl.

On the day between the two competition finals, some of the jury members give master classes to some of the non-finalists, which are open to the public.

Competition winners

Overall winners
Here are the overall winners of Cardiff Singer of the World since the contest's inception in 1983.

"Song Prize" winners
This prize was introduced in 1989; it was formerly known as the "Lieder Prize". Here are all the contestants who achieved the Song Prize since then.

"Audience Prize" winners
The "Dame Joan Sutherland Audience Prize" was introduced in 2003. Here are all the contestants who achieved the Song Prize since then.

See also 
 List of classical music competitions

References

External links

Cardiff Singer of the World competition
British biennial events
Opera competitions
Music competitions in the United Kingdom
Classical music television series
BBC Cymru Wales television shows
BBC Radio 3 programmes
Awards established in 1983
Early career awards
1983 establishments in Wales
Events in Cardiff
Music in Cardiff